PS Princess of Wales was a paddle steamer passenger vessel operated by the London and North Western Railway and the Lancashire and Yorkshire Railway from 1870 to 1896.

History

She was built by A. Leslie and Company on the River Tyne as one of the first new ships commissioned by the London and North Western Railway and the Lancashire and Yorkshire Railway for their services from Fleetwood.

References

1869 ships
Passenger ships of the United Kingdom
Steamships
Ships built on the River Tyne
Ships of the London and North Western Railway
Ships of the Lancashire and Yorkshire Railway
Paddle steamers of the United Kingdom